Kim Chang-sop (January 2, 1946 – June 9, 2020) was a North Korean politician who served as the Vice minister of the Ministry of State Security.

Early life and education
Kim Chang-sop was born on January 2, 1946, in the Unsan County in South Pyongan Province. He joined the Korean People's Army in July 1963. He was a graduate of the Kim Il-sung Higher Party School.

Career 
He was the vice minister of the State Security Department and was the head of the Political Department of that agency. He has also been the deputy of the Supreme People's Assembly since the 11th convocation in September 2003.

During the 3rd Conference of the Workers' Party of Korea on September 28, 2010, he was elected as an alternate member of the Political Bureau of the Central Committee, and also for the first time sat in the Central Committee itself.

Following the death of Kim Jong-il in December 2011, Kim Chang-sop was ranked 26th in the 232-member Mourning Committee.

Death 
Kim Chang Sop died in June 2020. His death was announced by the Korean Central News Agency.

References

Members of the Supreme People's Assembly
1946 births
2020 deaths
Alternate members of the 6th Politburo of the Workers' Party of Korea
Members of the 6th Central Committee of the Workers' Party of Korea